Rauia is a genus of flowering plants belonging to the family Rutaceae.

Its native range is southern Tropical America. It is found in Bolivia, (north, north-eastern and south-eastern) Brazil, Guyana, Peru, Suriname and  Venezuela.

The genus name of Rauia is in honour of Ambrosius Rau (1784–1830), a German botanist and mineralogist. He was also a professor of natural history and forestry. It was first described and published in Nova Acta Phys.-Med. Acad. Caes. Leop.-Carol. Nat. Cur. Vol.11 on page 151 in 1823.

Known species
According to Kew:
Rauia nodosa 
Rauia prancei 
Rauia resinosa 
Rauia spicata 
Rauia subtruncata

References

Zanthoxyloideae genera
Zanthoxyloideae
Plants described in 1823
Flora of northern South America
Flora of Bolivia
Flora of North Brazil
Flora of Northeast Brazil
Flora of Southeast Brazil